is a Japanese television series starring Nana Mori, Natsuki Deguchi, and Aju Makita, released by Netflix on January 12, 2023. Hirokazu Kore-eda served as director, writer, and showrunner, The Makanai being his first time directing a Netflix production.

Plot
The show is based on the manga Kiyo in Kyoto by Aiko Koyama. The nine episodes follow the story of best friends Kiyo (Mori) and Sumire (Deguchi) as they move from their hometown in northern Aomori to Kyoto's Gion district to live in an all-female house of geiko and maiko with dreams of becoming geiko themselves. Though Sumire is hailed as a talent, Kiyo is deemed unfit to become a maiko and becomes the house's live-in chef.

Cast

 Nana Mori as Kiyo
 Natsuki Deguchi as Sumire/Momohana
 Aju Makita as Ryoko
 Takako Tokiwa as Mother Azusa
 Keiko Matsuzaka as Mother Chiyo
 Ai Hashimoto as Momoko
 Mayu Matsuoka as Yoshino
 Momoko Fukuchi as Tsurukoma
 Lily Franky as Mr. Ren, the bartender

Production
Kore-eda directed the first two episodes, with the remaining seven directed by directors Megumi Tsuno, Hiroshi Okuyama, and Takuma Sato.

Depictions of geisha
Previous portrayals of geisha and their milieu, such as Arthur Golden's Memoirs of a Geisha and its film adaptation, have been criticised for conflating geisha culture as a form of "highly-stylized prostitution". The popularity of the film led to a surge in tourists in the geisha districts of Kyoto, instances of harassment of geisha in public, and a 2019 ban of photographing geisha implemented by the Gion geisha district. Kore-eda commented that the series might dispel some inaccurate beliefs perpetuated by Memoirs, such as maiko being sold by their parents. However, Kiyo's work as a makanai, the in-house cook and helper, is also unrealistic; there are no teenage makanai.

References

External links
 

2023 Japanese television series debuts
Japanese drama television series
Japanese television dramas based on manga
Japanese-language Netflix original programming
Television shows set in Kyoto